John Belton may refer to:
 John Belton (academic), Professor Emeritus of English and Film at Rutgers University
 John Aloysius Belton (1903–1968), Irish diplomat
 Jack Belton (died 1963), Irish politician
 Jackie Belton (1895–1952), English footballer with Nottingham Forest

See also
 John Belton O'Neall (1793–1863), judge in colonial South Carolina
 John Bolton (disambiguation)